The Wilson Museum is a museum in Castine, Maine, United States. It was founded using the collection of Dr John Howard Wilson, a geologist.

History
Wilson lived in Philadelphia, Brooklyn and Nantucket during his youth. He arrived at Castine in 1891 with his mother, Cassine Cartwright Wilson. He received a PhD in geology from Columbia University.

In 1921, Mrs Wilson gave the western part of the land she owned to build a museum for John Wilson's collections. The building was designed by architects Milton See & Son of New York. Three other buildings were added in the late 1960s, the Blacksmith Shop, Hearse House, and the John Perkins House.

Collections
 Rocks, minerals, shells.
 Pre-historic artifacts from North and South America.
 Exhibits from Europe and Africa illustrating the development of tools during the early Paleolithic, Neolithic, Bronze and Iron Ages.
 Six dioramas constructed by Ned Burns of the American Museum of Natural History in 1926.
 Cultures of Africa, Oceania, North and South America.
 Early weapons and firearms.
 Local history.
 Ship models.
 19th century carpenter's tools, farm and household equipment.
 Special exhibits every summer using the museum's collections.
 Archival material on the history of Castine.

References

External links
 The Wilson Museum website

1921 establishments in Maine
Museums established in 1921
Natural history museums in Maine
Biographical museums in Maine
Museums in Hancock County, Maine
Open-air museums in Maine
Castine, Maine